Kirt or KIRT may refer to:
K’irt’ or Kard, town in Armenia
Kirt, West Virginia, United States
KIRT, an American radio station

People with the name
Kirt Manwaring (born 1965), American baseball player
Kirt Niedrigh, comic book character
Kirt Ojala (born 1968), American baseball player
Kirt Thompson (born 1967), Trinidad and Tobago javelin thrower
Magnus Kirt (born 1990), Estonian athlete

See also
 Kurt (disambiguation)